Thomia was a small town of ancient Paphlagonia, situated between Stephane and Cape Syrtas (modern İnceburun), appearing on the Peutinger Table.

Its site is unlocated.

References

Populated places in ancient Paphlagonia
Former populated places in Turkey
Lost ancient cities and towns